The following is a list of attractions on Long Island, New York State. The list includes museums, parks, and beaches as well as many other types of attractions.

In this list, "Long Island" is defined as the geographical entity, and thus the list includes attractions in Kings County, New York, a.k.a. Brooklyn, as well as Queens County, New York, a.k.a. Queens, which are both parts of New York City. The list also includes attractions further out on Long Island, those in  Nassau County, New York and Suffolk County, New York, which are not parts of NYC but instead are parts of New York State.

Long Island attractions

Public beaches

Long Island is well known for its many public beaches. They include (from west to east):

 Coney Island (in Brooklyn)
 Coney Island Beach and Boardwalk
 The Rockaways (in Queens)
 Jacob Riis Park Beach
 Rockaway Beach and Boardwalk
 Nickerson Beach, (Long Beach)
 Long Beach
 Town of Hempstead Beaches at Point Lookout and Lido
 Town of North Hempstead Beaches: Bar Beach and Hempstead Harbor
 Town of Oyster Bay Beaches: Tobay, Stehli, Centre Island
 Cedar Beach (Fire Island)
 Jones Beach (Nassau County) - one of the most famous in the world
 Captree State Park
 Robert Moses State Park (Suffolk County)
 Sunken Meadow State Park, Kings Park in Suffolk County
 Town of Islip Beaches: Islip, East Islip, West Islip, Bayport and Ronkonkoma Beaches, Sayville Marina Park, Benjamin Beach at Bay Shore Marina, and several along the barrier beach of Fire Island, including Atlantique, Kismet, Dunewood, and Fair Harbor
 Town of Babylon Beaches: Gilgo Beach, Cedar Beach, and Overlook Beach
 Town of Brookhaven Beaches: West Meadow, Cedar, Shirley, Shoreham, Stony Brook, Cedar Beach
 Town of Riverhead beaches, including Iron Pier Beach
 Town of Southold Beaches: Kenny's Road, Horton Lane, and Hashamomuck Beaches.
 Town of Smithtown Beaches: Short Beach, Long Beach, Callahan's Beach
 Town of Huntington Beaches: Asharoken, Centerport, Crab Meadow, Crescent, Gold Star Battalion, Hobart, Fleets Cove, West Neck
 Southampton Town Beaches: Tiana, Ponquogue, and various others on Dune Road and Gin Lane
 Smith Point County Park (Suffolk County)
 Cupsogue Beach County Park
Hampton Bays in Town of Southampton area Suffolk County (Beaches: Ponquogue Beach, Meshutt Beach on Peconic Bay, Shinnecock Inlet Beach, K Road, L Road, Tiana Beach, and Road I on both Shinnecock Bay and the Atlantic Ocean.)
 East Hampton Main beach
 Hither Hills State Park
 Montauk Point State Park

Public parks and nature preserves
 Bethpage State Park
 Cedar Creek County Park, Seaford
 Christopher Morley Park
 Eisenhower Park
 Elderfields Preserve
 South Haven County Park
 Welwyn Preserve in Glen Cove

Country clubs
Long Island is also home to numerous country clubs, polo clubs, golf clubs, and other private recreational organizations, including:

 Bretton Woods Country Club (Coram)
 Bridgehampton Polo Club (Bridgehampton)
 Brookville Country Club (Glen Head)
 Cherry Valley Country Club (Garden City)
 Cold Spring Harbor Country Club (Cold Spring Hills)
 Colonial Springs Country Club (East Farmingdale)
 The Crescent Beach Club (Bayville)
 Crest Hollow Country Club (Woodbury)
 Deepdale Golf Club (Manhasset)
 Garden City Country Club (Garden City)
 Garden City Golf Club (Garden City)
 Glen Head Country Club (Glen Head)
 Engineers Country Club (Roslyn Harbor)
 Hamlet Golf and Country Club (Commack)
 The Hamlet Windwatch Golf Club (Hauppauge)
 Huntington Country Club (Huntington)
 Huntington Crescent Club (Huntington)
 Lake Success Country Club (Great Neck)
 Long Island Country Clubhouse in Eastport, New York
 Manhasset Bay Yacht Club
 Moments Golf Club (Elmont)
 Maidstone Club (East Hampton)
 Nassau Country Club (Glen Cove)
 Nissequogue Point Beach Club (Smithtown)
 North Hempstead Country Club (Flower Hill)
 North Hills Country Club (Manhasset)
 Northport Yacht Club (Huntington)
 Old Westbury Country Club (Old Westbury)
 Plandome Country Club (Plandome)
 Port Jefferson Country Club at Harbor Hills (Port Jefferson)
 Port Washington Yacht Club (Port Washington)
 Roslyn Country Club (Roslyn Heights)
 Rockville Links Country Club (Rockville Centre)
 St. George's Club (Stony Brook)
 Sayville Yacht Club (Blue Point)
 Seawane Country Club (Hewlett Harbor)
 Smithtown Landing Country Club (Smithtown)
 South Fork Country Club (Amagansett)
 Southward Ho Country Club (Brightwaters)
 Timber Point Country Club (Great River)
 Towers Country Club (Floral Park)
 Westhampton Country Club (Westhampton)
 Westhampton Yacht Squadron (Remsenburg)
 Woodbury Country Club (Woodbury)
 Strathmore Vanderbilt Country Club (Manhasset)

See also
 List of trails on Long Island
 List of museums on Long Island
 Parks and recreation in New York City

References

External links
 Nassau County Country Clubs at LongIslandGolfNews.com
 Suffolk County Country Clubs at LongIslandGolfNews.com

Tourist attractions on Long Island
Lists of tourist attractions in the United States by city
Tourist attractions